New World Animation Ltd., formerly known as Marvel Productions, was the television and film studio subsidiary of the Marvel Entertainment Group, based in Hollywood, Los Angeles, California. It later became a subsidiary of New World Entertainment and eventually of News Corporation (Fox Entertainment Group).

Marvel Productions produced animated television series, motion pictures, and television specials such as Spider-Man and His Amazing Friends, The Incredible Hulk, My Little Pony: The Movie, The Transformers: The Movie, and G.I. Joe: The Movie as well as The Transformers and G.I. Joe: A Real American Hero television series. Most of Marvel Productions/New World Animation's non-Hasbro-related back catalog (with the exception of Dungeons & Dragons) is currently owned by The Walt Disney Company.

History

DePatie–Freleng Enterprises (1963–1981) 
The company began in 1963 as DFE Films, and was sold to Cadence Industries, Marvel Comics Group's owner, in 1981 after DFE founder and company executive Friz Freleng departed the company to return to his former job at Warner Bros. Animation. Freleng's business partner and DFE co-founder David H. DePatie continued to work for the company under the Marvel banner for several years until his retirement.

Marvel Productions (1981–1993) 

Marvel Productions opened its Los Angeles studio in 1981. In 1984, Margaret Loesch joined Marvel Productions as President and Chief Executive Officer. Marvel Comics Group, owned by Cadence Industries Corporation since 1968, was sold to New World Pictures in 1986 along with Marvel Productions and incorporated as Marvel Entertainment Group (MEG).

With New World having cash flow problems, MEG was sold in January 1989 to Andrews Group, a MacAndrews and Forbes subsidiary, owned by Ronald Perelman. However, New World kept Marvel Productions and merged it with its own television business. MP moved their offices from Van Nuys to West Los Angeles in May 1989.

New World's problems continued, which led them to also be acquired by the Andrews Group within the year. Loesch left for Fox Kids in 1990. In December 1992, New World formed New World Family Filmworks and New World Action Animation, headed by Marvel Productions president Rick Ungar, to produce $20 million worth of family entertainment programming.

New World Animation (1993–1996) 
Marvel Productions was renamed New World Animation in November 1993. In 1994, Marvel and New World started up Marvel Films including Marvel Films Animation. New World Animation (The Incredible Hulk), Saban Entertainment (X-Men), and Marvel Films Animation (Spider-Man), each produced a Marvel series for television. Tom Tataranowicz was in charge of both Marvel Films Animation and New World Animation during this period.

News Corporation subsidiary (1996) 
News Corporation/Fox Entertainment Group acquired New World Entertainment, along with New World Animation and Marvel Films Animation for $2.5 billion in August 1996. At the same time, Saban Entertainment secured the rights from Marvel Entertainment Group for Captain America, Daredevil, and Silver Surfer, and additional characters to be developed into four series and 52 episodes over the next seven years.

Fox Children's Productions and Saban Entertainment merged to form Fox Kids Worldwide, a holding company and joint venture, in November 1996, while Fox retained ownership of New World Animation.

Postscript 
Fox Family Worldwide and its assets, including the Marvel Productions library and Saban Entertainment, were purchased by The Walt Disney Company for $5.2 billion in July 2001, with Saban Entertainment renamed to BVS Entertainment in October 2001.

After getting its 2002 profit participation statements for the Marvel Productions library, Marvel Enterprises sued The Walt Disney Company over royalties in August 2004 after Disney would not open their books. This was followed by a November 2004 suit which claimed that the purchase of Fox Family did not transfer the shows' copyrights to Disney as the purchase was done without Marvel's approval. As part of both suits, Marvel claimed library income concealment and failure to exploit the characters.

On August 31, 2009, Disney acquired Marvel Entertainment for $4 billion, reunifying the Marvel Productions library and Marvel Entertainment under the same corporate banner. Disney then sold the Power Rangers franchise – which was included in the Fox Family acquisition and originally part of the BVS library – to Saban Brands in 2010; that franchise, since 2018, is currently owned by Hasbro. After Disney's acquisition of 21st Century Fox on March 20, 2019, the Marvel Productions and Fox Kids/Saban Entertainment libraries reunited with the New World Animation library.

Animated series 

 The Young Astronauts, licensed from the Young Astronaut Council and also adapted into a comic book by Marvel Comics; never aired due to the Space Shuttle Challenger disaster causing CBS to cancel the show before being produced.
 Stealth Warriors

Original specials 

Except for Fraggle Rock, the rights to series based on Jim Henson properties are now held by The Muppets Studio, a subsidiary of the Walt Disney Company.

All programs based on Hasbro properties were co-productions with Sunbow Productions. These programs are now owned by Entertainment One.

Theatrical and DTV films

Executives 
 David H. DePatie – president and chief executive officer (1980–1984)
 Margaret Loesch – president and chief executive officer (1984–1990)
 Rick Ungar – president and chief executive officer (1991–August 1995)
 Lee Gunther – senior vice president, production (1986)
 Stan Lee – vice president, creative affairs (1986)
 Michael Wahl – vice president, business affairs (1986)
 Peter Knepper – vice president and chief financial officer (1986)
 Hank Sarovan – vice president (1986)

Notes

References

External links 
 
 
 

 
1981 establishments in California
1996 disestablishments in California
American companies established in 1981
American companies disestablished in 1996
American animation studios
Companies based in Los Angeles
Defunct film and television production companies of the United States
Marvel Comics animation
Marvel Entertainment
Mass media companies disestablished in 1996
Mass media companies established in 1981